Poetry is a duo album by saxophonist Stan Getz and Albert Dailey which was recorded in 1983 and released on the Elektra/Musician label.  It was reissued on CD on the Blue Note label in 2001.

Reception

The Allmusic review by Scott Yanow stated: "This duet session is as much pianist Albert Dailey's date as Stan Getz's. Getz lets Dailey, who died a little over a year later, dominate the music and the lyrical pianist comes up with some fresh ideas during the standards set".

Track listing
 "Confirmation" (Charlie Parker) - 5:24
 "A Child Is Born" (Thad Jones) - 5:19
 "Tune Up" (Miles Davis) - 5:41
 "Lover Man" (Jimmy Davis, Ram Ramirez, Jimmy Sherman) - 6:54
 "A Night in Tunisia" (Dizzy Gillespie, Frank Paparelli) - 5:26
 "Spring Can Really Hang You Up the Most" (Tommy Wolf, Fran Landesman) - 6:30 	
 "'Round Midnight" (Thelonious Monk, Cootie Williams, Bernie Hanighen) - 7:32

Personnel 
Stan Getz - tenor saxophone (tracks 1-3, 5 & 6) 
Albert Dailey - piano

References 

1984 albums
Stan Getz albums
Albert Dailey albums
Elektra/Musician albums